75th Police Precinct Station House is a historic police station located in Brooklyn, New York.  It was built in 1886 and is a three-story, yellow brick building above a sandstone foundation and watertable in the Romanesque Revival style.  It features a round corner tower and Norman-inspired projecting main entrance portico.  The stable is a two-story brick building connected to the station house by a one-story brick passage.  It ceased use as a police station in 1973 and later used by a local church.

It was listed on the National Register of Historic Places in 2007.

Gallery

References

Government buildings on the National Register of Historic Places in New York City
Government buildings completed in 1886
Infrastructure completed in 1886
Government buildings in Brooklyn
Renaissance Revival architecture in New York City
Police stations on the National Register of Historic Places
National Register of Historic Places in Brooklyn
New York City Police Department buildings